Humboldtianidae is an American family of air-breathing land snails, terrestrial pulmonate gastropod mollusks in the superfamily Helicoidea (according to the taxonomy of the Gastropoda by Bouchet & Rocroi, 2005).

Anatomy
The anatomy of this family is defined by the presence of a diverticulum and three to four dart apparatuses (the love dart is used in mating behaviour). They always have the same number of dart sacs and mucus glands, with two darts per dart sac. The mucus glands are situated on, and open into, the vagina, above the dart sac.

Distribution 
This family of snails occurs in the United States and Mexico.

Taxonomy 
The family Humboldtianidae is classified within the clade Stylommatophora within the clade Eupulmonata (according to the taxonomy of the Gastropoda by Bouchet & Rocroi, 2005).

The family Humboldtianidae consists of the following subfamilies:
 subfamily Bunnyinae  H. Nordsieck, 1987 
 subfamily Humboldtianinae  Pilsbry, 1939

Genera 
There are only 2 genera in the family Humboldtianidae:
 genus  Bunnya H. B. Baker, 1942 - type genus of the subfamily Bunnyinae
 genus Humboldtiana Ihering, 1892 - type genus of the family Humboldtianidae
 subgenus Oreades Thompson & Brewer, 2000
 subgenus Polyomphala Thompson & Brewer, 2000

References

External links 
Humboldtianidae